Elgin High School, or EHS, is a public four-year high school located  in Elgin, Illinois, an American city 40 mi. (63.5 km) northwest of Chicago. It is part of Elgin Area School District U46, which also includes Bartlett High School, Larkin High School, South Elgin High School, and Streamwood High School.

History
Elgin High School is one of the oldest public high schools in the state. Its first graduation ceremony was held in 1872 and its accreditation dates back to 1904. It was formerly housed on Gifford Street adjacent to Gifford Park in a building that now serves as the Gifford Street High School.  A new campus was constructed on the eastern edge of Elgin adjacent to Poplar Creek, which is its present location. Elgin High was first established in 1869 in Illinois and has changed locations 3 times so far. The school, however, is not represented by any mascot, as the previous mascot "The Maroon" (a Native American) was considered to be racist and was removed in 2009. As a replacement for the former mascot each incoming freshmen class chooses a mascot and a class color to represent their year.

Academics
As of 2018-2019, Elgin is ranked 9,708 nationally, 308 in Illinois High Schools, 226 in Chicago Metra Area High Schools, and 4th in District U-46. 

                                                  

-College Readiness Index Rank                      #4,046 (National)	#165 (State)
-College Curriculum Breadth Index Rank             #3,227	#128
-Math and Reading Proficiency Rank                 #14,086 	#511
-Math and Reading Performance Rank                 #13,696	#497
-Graduation Rate Rank                              #16,230  #592 

Elgin High School also holds one of District U-46's magnet academies, and of which Elgin High holds the Gifted and Talented Acedemy. This academy allows accepted students to participate in college and advance courses starting from Freshman year all the way to Senior year of high school. The academy helps the students to think expansionary by taking advanced coursework, which prepares them for college. Currently, Elgin High is nominated to be and will soon be an international IB course and AP course school in the future. Elgin High also offers (out of the 5 high schools in the district) vast and the most academic opportunities and choices.

Demographics
As of 2018-2019, the EHS student body was 9.6% White, 6.2% Black, 75% Hispanic, .7% Native American, 5.4% Asian, and 2.4% other races. 75% of students were listed as low-income.

Athletics and activities
Elgin competes in the Upstate Eight Conference.  In 2003, Chief Maroon was removed as Elgin's mascot.

The following teams have won their respective Illinois High School Association state championships:

Elgin High School offers a variety of school activities and sports that students could participate in, with some being a tradition for over 150 years, since 1869.

Sports:

Wrestling
Basketball
Soccer
Football
Volleyball
Softball
Baseball
Cheer/Dance
Track
Cross Country
Bowling
Lacrosse
Etc.

Activities:

Scholastic Bowl
Tech Club
Acapella
Low-Keys
Jazz Choir
Model United Nations 
Black Student Union
Science Olympiad
Etc.

Notable alumni

 Max Adler (1883), vice-president of Sears & Roebuck, benefactor of Adler Planetarium
 Ray Barnhart (1945), Texas politician
 Earl Britton (1922), National Football League fullback and punter
 Nina Burleigh (1978), journalist and best-selling author
 Jack Burmaster (1944), professional basketball player, coach, and broadcaster
 Harry Chamberlin (1905), U.S. Army brigadier general and Olympic medalist in equestrian events
 Gail Monroe Dack (1918), American physician and professor of microbiology
 August W. Farwick (1921) football player, coach at University of Arizona
 Paul Flory (1927) polymer chemist, recipient of 1974 Nobel Prize
 Laurence Kaptain (1970), international performer and recording artist, dean of College of Music and Dramatic Arts at LSU
 William LeBaron (1900), producer of Cimarron, Academy Award-winning film
 Jack Meagher, college football coach for Rice and Auburn
 Douglas R. Mills (1926), University of Illinois athletic director and men's basketball coach
 Earl "Madman" Muntz, engineer, entrepreneur, marketing pioneer, television personality
 Lou North (1910), Major League Baseball pitcher
 Jane Peterson (1901), painter and artist
 Brian Oldfield (1963), Olympic shot putter and pop culture personality
 John Qualen (1920), actor
 Steve Rauschenberger (1974) state senator, 1993 to 2007
 Flynn Robinson (1959), NBA player
 James Roche (1923) president of General Motors
 Tom Shales (1962), television critic for The Washington Post, 1988 recipient of Pulitzer Prize for Criticism
 Rick Sund (1970), NBA executive
 Don Sunderlage (1947), All-Star player in NBA
 John Walker, 1974, producer of The Incredibles, Oscar-winning film
 Jeff Wilkins (1973), NBA player

Notable staff
 Larry Nemmers is a former principal (1982–94).  He notably served as an NFL official (1985–2007).

References

External links
Official Website

Educational institutions established in 1869
Elgin, Illinois
Public high schools in Cook County, Illinois
1869 establishments in Illinois
Elgin Area School District U46